Khalid Abdullah (born May 14, 1995) is a former American football running back. He attended college at James Madison University. He played for the DC Defenders of the XFL in 2020.

Collegiate career
Abdullah played college football for the James Madison Dukes, competing in the NCAA Division I Football Championship Subdivision (FCS). When the Dukes won the FCS championship for the 2016 season, Abdullah was MVP of the Championship Game played in January 2017, as the Dukes defeated the Youngstown State Penguins.

Professional career

New York Giants 
After going undrafted in the 2017 NFL Draft, Abdullah signed with the New York Giants.  On September 3, 2017, he was released.

Team Grit 
Abdullah played for Team Grit of YCF.

DC Defenders 
In October 2019, Abdullah was drafted by the DC Defenders during the open phase of the 2020 XFL Draft. He had his contract terminated when the league suspended operations on April 10, 2020.

References

External links
 James Madison Dukes bio

Living people
1995 births
American football running backs
DC Defenders players
James Madison Dukes football players
New York Giants players
Players of American football from Virginia
Sportspeople from Newport News, Virginia